On 5 January 1945, a party of five Indonesians left Darwin to ascertain the fate of Operation Lion. On 14 January, the Dutch submarine K XV lands the party at the coast of the Djiko Doped Bay, north east Minahassa. The leader was captured; the remainder were evacuated by Catalina flying boat on 31 January.

References

Bibliography 
 National Archives Australia – [SRD (Services Reconnaissance Department) HQ] NEI [Netherlands East Indies] Section IASD [Inter-Allied Services Department].

Military operations involving the Netherlands
Military operations of World War II involving Australia